Worried About the Boy is a 2010 British biographical drama television film directed by Julian Jarrold and written by Tony Basgallop, based on the life of English singer Boy George. It stars Douglas Booth as Boy George and Mathew Horne as his lover Jon Moss. It aired on BBC Two on 16 May 2010 as part of the channel's Eighties Season.

Plot
In 1980, young George O'Dowd (Boy George) argues with his parents over his femininity and moves into a squat with Peter, who dresses as Marilyn Monroe and calls himself Marilyn. They make themselves known at Steve Strange's trendy Blitz Club where George gets a job in the cloakroom. George is unlucky in his relationships with men until he meets musician Kirk Brandon. Through Kirk, George meets the handsome drummer Jon Moss, on whom he develops a crush.

Sacked by the Blitz and spurned by Kirk, George turns to Sex Pistols manager Malcolm McLaren to further his music career. George's spell with McLaren's group Bow Wow Wow is cut short when the rest of the group reveal to McLaren how much they hate George, but fan Mikey Craig is impressed and asks George to sing in a group he is forming, where George again meets Jon Moss. They have an affair and their group Culture Club becomes very successful. Four years later, however, hounded by the tabloid press amid stories of his drug addiction, an unhappy George turns to Jon for advice on his future.

Main cast

 Douglas Booth as Boy George
 Mathew Horne as Jon Moss
 Mark Gatiss as Malcolm McLaren
Dean Fagan as Mikey Craig
 Marc Warren as  Steve Strange
 Freddie Fox as  Marilyn
 Francis Magee as Jerry O'Dowd
 Richard Madden as Kirk Brandon
Jonny Burt as Roy Hay
Isabel Ford as  Mrs. Brandon
Hannah Harford as Sarah
 Julian Jarrold as Director
Elizabeth Lowe as Caroline
Natalie O'Brien as Emily
Nicola Potts as Dawn
Suzanne Nichole Preston as Mo
Daniel Wallace as Christopher
Charlie Anson as Vernon (uncredited)
Andy Quine as Career Advisor (uncredited)

References

External links
 
 

2010 television films
2010 films
2010 biographical drama films
2010 LGBT-related films
Biographical films about singers
Biographical television films
British biographical drama films
British LGBT-related television films
Drama films based on actual events
British drama television films
Films directed by Julian Jarrold
Films set in the 1980s
Gay-related films
LGBT-related drama films
Pop music films
Cultural depictions of pop musicians
Cultural depictions of British men
2010s English-language films
2010s British films